Junoon (translation: The Obsession) is a 1978 Indian Hindi language film produced by Shashi Kapoor and directed by Shyam Benegal. The film is based on Ruskin Bond's fictional novella, A Flight of Pigeons, set around the Indian Rebellion of 1857. The film's soundtrack was composed by Vanraj Bhatia, and cinematography by Govind Nihalani.

Its cast included Shashi Kapoor, his wife Jennifer Kendal, Nafisa Ali, Tom Alter, Shabana Azmi, Kulbhushan Kharbanda, Naseeruddin Shah, Deepti Naval, Pearl Padamsee and Sushma Seth. The film also featured Shashi and Jennifer's children Karan Kapoor, Kunal Kapoor, and Sanjana Kapoor.

Plot

The story is set around the Indian Rebellion of 1857. Javed Khan (Shashi Kapoor) is a reckless feudal chieftain of Muslim Pathan heritage, whose world revolves around breeding carrier pigeons. His younger brother-in-law, Sarfaraz Khan (Naseeruddin Shah) is politically awakened and actively plots the fight against the British Empire. Freedom fighters attack the local British administrators while they are in Sunday Worship at church, massacring them all. Miriam Labadoor (Jennifer Kendal) manages to escape with her daughter, Ruth (Nafisa Ali) and mother (Ismat Chugtai), who is a Muslim lady from the royal Nawab family of Rampur and was married to an Englishman. The three women seek refuge with the wealthy Hindu family of Lala Ramjimal (Kulbhushan Kharbanda). Lala is torn between his loyalty to India and his privileged position under the British, and also his silent love towards Miriam, who seems to also reciprocate it silently. However, matters are taken out of his hand by Javed Khan who barges into Lala's house and forcibly takes Ruth and her family to his own house. This leads to jealousy on part of his wife, Firdaus (Shabana Azmi) and anger on part of his brother, who ultimately gives in to the Pathan tradition of offering hospitality and sanctuary (Nanawatai) even to uninvited guests. Various situations ensue due to cultural misunderstandings in the domestic routine of the Muslim household with its new English guests. Javed falls in love with Ruth, and wants to marry her but is opposed bitterly by her mother.  Noticing the intense feelings of Javed for her daughter Ruth, Miriam Labadoor (mother) cleverly makes an agreement with Javed that she would only give her daughter's hand to Javed if the British were defeated.  In the first instance, Javed is hesitant but accepts the offer when again Miriam asks him if he has misgivings in his war against the British.  There are simmerings of a love affair under the watchful suspicious eyes of Firdaus.

Meanwhile, the Rebellion runs into problems and the British are defeating the poorly organized Indian forces. In a stormy scene, Sarfaraz destroys Javed's pigeon coops and sets his pets free after he finds out that Indian forces have lost the Battle for Delhi. There is a delayed recognition by Javed of his subjugated identity, colonized by the British. Sarfaraz dies in a battle against the British. The Labadoors return to the protection of the re-deployed British contingent, smuggled by Firdaus, who only wants to save her marriage. Javed finds out that the Labadoors have sought sanctuary in the church and rushes there to meet Ruth one last time.  Surprisingly, Ruth comes out and expresses her feelings for Javed against her mother's will.  However, Javed honorably keeps his word and the promise he had made with Miriam Labadoor and leaves the church without Ruth. The movie ends here with the voiceover that Javed was martyred fighting the British while Ruth and her mother return to England. Ruth dies fifty-five years later, unwed.

Cast

 Shashi Kapoor as Javed Khan
 Nafisa Ali as Ruth Labadoor
 Jennifer Kendal as Miriam Labadoor (Ruth's Mother)
 Naseeruddin Shah as Sarfaraz Khan, Javed's brother-in-law
 Shabana Azmi as Firdaus, Javed's wife
 Ismat Chughtai as Miriam's Mom
 Kulbhushan Kharbanda as Lala Ramjimal
 Sanjana Kapoor
 Kunal Kapoor
 Karan Kapoor
 Benjamin Gilani as Rashid Khan
 Sushma Seth as Javed's aunt
 Tom Alter as Priest (Ruth's father)
 Amrish Puri as the Narrator
 Jalal Agha as Kader Khan
 Geoffrey Kendal
 Rajesh Vivek
 Deepti Naval as Rashid's wife
 Pearl Padamsee as Akhtarbee, bitter woman
 Savita Bajaj

Reception
In a retrospective review, Raja Sen of Rediff.com called it "an overwhelmingly powerful film, a bittersweet, entirely futile love story."

Awards
1979 National Film Awards:
 Best Feature Film in Hindi – Shashi Kapoor (as producer)
 Best Cinematography – Govind Nihalani
 Best Audiography – Hitendra Ghosh
27th Filmfare Awards:

Won
 Best Film – Shashi Kapoor
 Best Director – Shyam Benegal
 Best Dialogue – Pandit Satyadev Dubey
 Best Cinematography – Govind Nihalani
 Best Editing – Bhanudas Divakar
 Best Sound Recording – Hitendra Ghosh
Nominated
 Best Supporting Actor – Naseeruddin Shah
 Best Supporting Actress – Jennifer Kendal
 Best Story – Ruskin Bond

Recognition
 Inaugural film at the 7th International Film Festival, New Delhi, 1979.
 Official Indian entry at the XIth Moscow International Film Festival.
 Featured at the Montreal World Film Festival 1979, the Cairo International Film Festival 1979, the Sydney Film Festival 1980 and the Melbourne International Film Festival 1980.

Soundtrack

The soundtrack features 4 songs, composed by Vanraj Bhatia, with original lyrics from Yogesh Praveen and other lyrics by Amir Khusro, Jigar Moradabadi and Sant Kabir.

 "Khusro rain piya ki jaagi pee ke sang" – Jamil Ahmad
 "Ishq ne todi sar pe qayamat" – Mohammad Rafi
 "Come live with me and be my love" – Jennifer Kendal
 "Ghir aayi kari ghata matwali sawan ki aayi bahaar re" – Asha Bhosle, Varsha Bhosle

See also
 List of Asian historical drama films

References

External links
 
 
 

1978 films
1970s Hindi-language films
Films directed by Shyam Benegal
Films set in Lucknow
Films set in the Indian independence movement
Films set in the British Raj
Films set in the 1850s
Films whose cinematographer won the Best Cinematography National Film Award
Films about the Indian Rebellion of 1857
Films that won the Best Audiography National Film Award
Best Hindi Feature Film National Film Award winners
Films based on Indian novels